George Alfred Leon Sarton (31 August 1884 – 22 March 1956) was a Belgian-born American chemist and historian. He is considered the founder of the discipline of the history of science as an independent field of study. His most influential works were the Introduction to the History of Science, which consists of three volumes and 4,296 pages and the journal Isis. Sarton ultimately aimed to achieve an integrated philosophy of science that provided a connection between the sciences and the humanities, which he referred to as "the new humanism".

Sarton's life and work
George Alfred Leon Sarton was born to Léonie Van Halmé and Alfred Sarton on August 31, 1884 in Ghent, East Flanders, Belgium. However, within a year of his birth, Sarton's mother died. He attended school first in his hometown before later attending school for a period of four years in the town of Chimay.  Sarton enrolled at the University of Ghent in 1902 to study philosophy, but found that the subject did not correspond with his interests and subsequently ceased his studies.  In 1904, after a period of reflection, he re-enrolled in the university to study the natural sciences. During his time at the University of Ghent Sarton received several honors.  In 1908, the four Belgium universities gave him a gold medal for chemistry, and the city of Ghent gave him a silver laurel for a memoir he wrote.  He graduated with his doctorate in 1911 with a thesis in celestial mechanics. Shortly after his graduation, on June 22, 1911, Sarton married Elanor Mabel Elwes, an artist and distinguished furniture designer.  The couple moved to a house in Wondelgem where their only child, a daughter, Eleanore Marie or May was born in 1912.

During World War 1, in August 1914, the German army invaded Belgium. At this time Sarton was no longer an official member of Belgium's Civil Guard. Nevertheless, when the invasion occurred, he reported in and was assigned to patrol the nearby railroad intersection, but encountered no German soldiers that night.  Under German occupation, members of the Civil Guard were treated as spies, and Sarton buried his Civil Guard coat in the garden so he would not be taken up and shot as a spy. During the occupation, twenty-six German soldiers were billeted at his house and he was held responsible for the soldiers' safety. If any of the enlisted men staying at his house had not met curfew, Sarton would have been shot. Soon after the German occupation, the Sarton family immigrated to England, first traveling to the Netherlands then onward to London. They were not able to take many things with them, so the notes for Sarton's History of Science were left buried with his coat. In England, Sarton worked in the War Office, but he was unable to support a family of three on his salary. He left for the United States in search of a position that would enable him to support his family and allow him to complete his dream of writing the History of Science.  His wife and daughter followed him to America in September 1915.

Sarton taught at the University of Illinois in the summer of 1915 and received the award of the Prix Binoux of the Académie des Sciences, Paris, for his work in the history of science. He worked for the Carnegie Foundation for International Peace and lectured at Harvard University, 1916–18. While at Harvard University, Sarton lectured in philosophy in the academic year of 1916–1917, and in history of science in the academic year of 1917–1918. Sarton also taught at Teachers College at Columbia University during the summer of 1917. At Harvard, he became a lecturer in 1920, and a professor of the history of science from 1940 until his retirement in 1951. He was also a research associate of the Carnegie Institution of Washington from 1919 until 1948. After being appointed as research associate, Sarton began planning the revival of Isis.

Sarton intended to complete an exhaustive nine-volume history of science entitled Introduction to the History of Science. During the preparation of the second volume, he learned Arabic and traveled around the Middle East for part of his research, inspecting original manuscripts of Islamic scientists. During his time in the Middle East, he helped to institutionalize the school of Spanish Arabists. Sarton began working with the school of Spanish Arabists in 1928, then led by Julian Ribera y Tarrago and Miguel Asin Palacios. The Spanish Arabists contributed to Isis and Sarton had some of their articles published in Isis. Sarton shared more views in common with the Spanish Arabists than he did with other historians of science. They had similar views on what constitutes science. Sarton and the Spanish also shared similar views on diffusion. He led a group of scholars who acted as patrons to the Spanish. Sarton acknowledged that Julian Ribera was the leading Spanish Arabist. Sarton also was interested and wrote articles on Ribera's research on the transition of Eastern music to the West. Sarton later associated his interest in scientific diffusion with Ribera's interest in the transmission of music because in medieval times, music was commonly associated with mathematics and a part of the quadrivium. Sarton believed that the Islamic contribution to science was the most "progressive" element in medieval learning and was outraged when Western medieval studies ignored it. By the time of his death, he had completed only the first three volumes: I. From Homer to Omar Khayyam; II. From Rabbi Ben Ezra to Roger Bacon, pt. 1–2; and III. Science and learning in the fourteenth-century, pt. 1–2. Sarton had been inspired for his project by his study of Leonardo da Vinci, but he had not reached this period in history before dying. However one series of lectures Sarton gave during his first year at Harvard discussed da Vinci and were entitled " Science and Civilization in the Time of Leonardo da Vinci, Scientist and Artist."

After his death (March 22, 1956, Cambridge, Massachusetts), a representative selection of Sarton's papers was edited by Dorothy Stimson. It was published by Harvard University Press in 1962.

History of Science Society
In honor of Sarton's achievements, the History of Science Society created the award known as the George Sarton Medal. It is the most prestigious award of the History of Science Society. It has been awarded annually since 1955 to an outstanding historian of science selected from the international scholarly community. The medal honors a scholar for lifetime scholarly achievement. Sarton was the founder of this society and of its journals: Isis and Osiris, which publish articles on science and culture. George Sarton was the editor of his journal, Isis, from 1913 until 1952, when he retired and Bernard Cohen took over as editor for the journal.

Selected publications

Articles
 1924: 
 1927–48: Introduction to the History of Science (3 v. in 5), Carnegie Institution of Washington Publication # 376, Baltimore: Williams and Wilkins, Co.
 1951: "The Incubation of Western Culture in the Middle East: a George C. Keiser Foundation Lecture", March 29, 1950, Washington, D.C.

Books
 1927: Introduction to the History of Science (I. From Homer to Omar Khayyam) 
 1931: Introduction to the History of Science (II. From Rabbi Ben Ezra to Roger Bacon, pt. 1-2)
 1931: The History of Science and the New Humanism, New York: Henry Holt & Company
 1936: The Study of the History of Mathematics & The Study of the History of Science, 1954 Dover reprint from Internet Archive
 1947/8: Introduction to the History of Science (III. Science and learning in the fourteenth-century, pt. 1–2, 1947–48). Baltimore: Williams & Wilkins.
 1948: The Life of Science: Essays in the History of Civilization. Edited by Max H. Fisch. New York: Henry Schuman.
 1952: A History of Science. Ancient science through the Golden Age of Greece, Cambridge, Massachusetts: Harvard University Press
 1959: A History of Science. Hellenistic science and culture in the last three centuries B.C., Cambridge, Massachusetts: Harvard University Press
 1965: The Study of the History of Science (German: Das Studium der Geschichte der Naturwissenschaften, Frankfurt am Main: Klostermann)

Notes

External links 
 
 Full-text works of George Sarton on Internet Archive
 May Sarton (1976) An Informal Portrait of George Sarton, chapter 1 of A World of Light — Portraits and Celebrations, W. W. Norton & Company

1884 births
1956 deaths
20th-century American chemists
20th-century American historians
American male non-fiction writers
Belgian emigrants to the United States
Ghent University alumni
Harvard University faculty
Historians of science
Fellows of the Medieval Academy of America
20th-century American male writers